The 2024 United States House of Representatives election in Alaska will be held on November 5, 2024, to elect a member of the United States House of Representatives to represent the state of Alaska from its . The election will coincide with the 2024 U.S. presidential election, as well as other elections to the U.S. House, elections to the United States Senate, and various other state and local elections.

Incumbent Democratic representative Mary Peltola was elected to a full term in 2022 with 55.0% of the vote using instant-runoff voting.

Candidates

Democratic Party

Potential
 Mary Peltola, incumbent U.S. Representative

General election

Predictions

References

2024
Alaska
United States House of Representatives